Lieutenant-Colonel Sir Alexander Gordon  (1786 – 18 June 1815) was a Scottish officer in the  British Army who was killed at the Battle of Waterloo. His correspondence was collated and published early in the early 21st century.

Life
Gordon was the third son of George Gordon, Lord Haddo, son of George Gordon, 3rd Earl of Aberdeen, and Charlotte Baird. His brothers were Prime Minister George Hamilton-Gordon, 4th Earl of Aberdeen, and Sir Robert Gordon. He joined the military campaign against Napoleon during the Battle of Corunna in 1808 as the Aide-de-camp to his uncle, General Sir David Baird, 1st Baronet. He then became ADC to Arthur Wellesley, 1st Duke of Wellington for the next six years, until he was killed at Waterloo.

Military
Gordon received brevet promotions to Major and Lieutenant-Colonel as a reward for carrying to London despatches announcing victory, first at the Battle of Corunna and then at Ciudad Rodrigo. After Bonaparte's exile to Elba in 1814, Gordon was made a KCB. He was mortally wounded at Waterloo while rallying Brunswickers near La Haye Sainte, and died in Wellington's own camp bed in his headquarters during the night.

The following is an account by John Robert Hume who was visiting the Duke of Wellington after the Battle of Waterloo,

Wellington wrote to Lord Aberdeen after his brother's death,

Bed
The bed in which Gordon died is preserved at the Wellington Museum, Waterloo.

Monument

A monument to Gordon, in the form of a severed column, was erected on the battlefield in 1817.

Bibliography
 "This volume comprises the letters written to his brother, Lord Aberdeen, later foreign secretary, and prime minister during the Crimean war, and Aberdeen’s replies,  ... They form an almost continuous narrative of the campaigns, and often reveal more of the thinking behind operations than do the duke’s own despatches".

Notes

References

1786 births
1815 deaths
Scots Guards officers
Knights Commander of the Order of the Bath
British military personnel killed in action in the Napoleonic Wars
Younger sons of barons